Tegopelte gigas (from the Greek tegos, “tile,” and pelte, “leather-shield,” referring to the shape of the dorsal body covering; gigas – from the Greek gigas, “giant,” due to the huge size of the animal) is a species of large (1 complete specimen was 27 cm) soft-bodied arthropod known from two specimens from the Burgess Shale. Trackways that may have been produced by this organism or a close relative are known from the Kicking Horse Shale, stratigraphically below its body fossil occurrences. T. gigas is the only species classified under the genus Tegopelte. It is usually classified under its own family Tegopeltidae, but is sometimes placed under the family Naraoiidae. It is currently considered a member of Conciliterga within the Artiopoda.

References

External links 
 

Burgess Shale fossils
Cambrian arthropods
Artiopoda

Cambrian genus extinctions